Our Most Holy Redeemer is a late 19th-century church in Clerkenwell, London, England, by the architect John Dando Sedding. It is an Anglo-Catholic church in the Diocese of London of the Church of England. It is at the junction of Exmouth Market and Rosebery Avenue in the London Borough of Islington. The church with attached clergy house, campanile, and parish hall is a Grade II*-listed building.

History
This Italianate church was built in 1888 to the designs of J. D. Sedding, and completed, after his death, by his assistant Henry Wilson, 1892–95. The church, which was built in the grounds of the former Spa Fields Chapel, originally comprised just the building on the left in the illustration, the campanile tower and clergy house on the right being added in 1906. The inscription on the cornice of the original structure reads Christo Liberatori translated as 'To Christ The Redeemer'.

The interior of the church, including the baldacchino, was modelled upon Brunelleschi's Santo Spirito, Florence. Sculptural carving to the interior is by F. W. Pomeroy.

Present day
The Church of Our Most Holy Redeemer is within the Traditional Catholic tradition of the Church of England and receives alternative episcopal oversight from the Bishop of Fulham (currently Jonathan Baker).

Gallery

References

External links

 

19th-century Church of England church buildings
Clerkenwell
Buildings and structures in Clerkenwell
Clerkenwell
Churches completed in 1888
Diocese of London
Grade II* listed churches in London
Clerkenwell